Ota ika is a Oceanian dish consisting of raw fish marinated in citrus juice and coconut milk. The Tongan, Tahitian, and Samoan variants are essentially identical in that the raw fish is briefly marinated in lemon or lime juice until the surface of the flesh becomes opaque. The fish is then mixed with coconut milk and diced vegetables (most commonly cucumber, tomato, onion, green onion, and spicy peppers). This is the national dish of Tonga.

Names 
 Cook Islands: 
 Fiji: 
 French Polynesia: , 
 Nauru: coconut fish
 Niue: 
 Samoa: 
 Tokelau: 
 Tonga: 
 Tuvalu: 
 Wallis and Futuna: 

The dish is otherwise known as coconut fish in Nauru, kokoda in Fiji and Papua New Guinea, oka in Samoa, ika mata in the Cook Islands and New Zealand, oraora in Kiribati, and simply poisson cru on the French islands. The word "ota" means "raw" within the Polynesian language group, although the more common term for the dish in French Polynesia is its French equivalent, "poisson cru" (literally, "raw fish"). Any type of seafood can be used to make "ota," the word "ika" means fish ("i'a" in Samoan language), but the dish is often prepared with mussels ("ota pipi/maso"), prawns ("ota ulavai"), crab ("ota pa'a/paka"), lobster ("ota ula"), octopus/squid ("ota fe'e/feke"), sea urchin ("ota vana/tuitui"), and eel ("ota pusi").

Gallery

Similar dishes 
A very similar dish is the kinilaw of the Philippines, and its descendant dish, the kelaguen of the Marianas Islands. The poke of Hawaii is also similar though it does not use citrus juices or coconut milk. It is also similar to the Latin American ceviche, though the latter is relatively recent and may be a derivative dish, as citruses are not native to the Americas.

See also 
Kinilaw
Kelaguen
Hinava
Ceviche
Crudo
Hoe
Hoe-deopbap
List of hors d'oeuvre
List of raw fish dishes
List of salads
Poke
Tataki
Singju
Yusheng

Sources

Further reading
 "Ota ika (raw fish in coconut milk)", The Polynesian Kitchen

Cook Islands cuisine
Fijian cuisine
French Polynesian cuisine
Niuean cuisine
Nauruan cuisine
Norfolk Island cuisine
Gilbertese cuisine
Samoan cuisine
Tokelauan cuisine
Tongan cuisine
Tuvaluan cuisine
Pitcairn Islands cuisine
Papua New Guinean cuisine
Wallis and Futuna cuisine
Polynesian cuisine
Melanesian cuisine
Micronesian cuisine
Oceanian cuisine
Uncooked fish dishes
Seafood dishes
Raw fish salads